National Lampoon's Last Resort (also known as Last Resort or National Lampoon's Scuba School) is a 1994 direct-to-video comedy film directed by Rafal Zielinski.  The film stars Corey Feldman and Corey Haim as Sam and Dave, two friends who are visiting a Caribbean island resort.

Plot
Sam and Dave, after being fired from a fast food outlet and getting evicted, are magically transported to Sam's uncle's island. Sam and Dave are asked to help save the island. The band Dread Zeppelin perform the film's theme song as credits roll at the end.

Cast 
 Corey Feldman as Sam
 Corey Haim as Dave
 Geoffrey Lewis as Rex Carver, Sam's Uncle 
 Maureen Flannigan as Sonja, a scuba diving instructor
 Demetra Hampton as Alex
 Robert Mandan as Hemlock, a corporate raider determined to take over the island.
 Patrick Labyorteaux as Young Hemlock
 Milton Selzer as Irv
 Tony Longo as Rob
 Michael Ralph as Flash
 Zelda Rubinstein as Old Hermit
 Brandy Ledford as Mermaid 
 Dread Zeppelin (Jah Paul Jo, Carl Jah, Put-Mon, Ed Zeppelin, Spice and Tortelvis) as themselves

Production 
Filmed in the Cayman Islands and La Habra Heights, California, United States

Reception
Entertainment Weekly said, "the latest movie offering bearing the Lampoon name, the too-aptly titled National Lampoon’s Last Resort, hits bottom in a way the magazine’s founders surely never contemplated: Not only is this mutation mind-bogglingly inept and bland, it’s also inexcusably unfunny.

References

External links 
 
 

1994 films
1994 direct-to-video films
1990s teen comedy films
American teen comedy films
Direct-to-video comedy films
Films directed by Rafal Zielinski
Films set in the Caribbean
Films set on islands
Films shot in California
Films shot in the Cayman Islands
National Lampoon films
1994 comedy films
Films produced by Damian Lee
Films with screenplays by Damian Lee
1990s English-language films
1990s American films